Peter B. Zivic (March 26, 1901 – January, 1987) was an American boxer who competed in the 1920 Summer Olympics. He was born in Pittsburgh, Pennsylvania and was the older brother of Jack Zivic. In 1920 he was eliminated in the quarter-finals of the flyweight class after losing his fight to the upcoming silver medalist Anders Pedersen.

References

External links
profile

1901 births
1987 deaths
Boxers from Pennsylvania
Flyweight boxers
Olympic boxers of the United States
Boxers at the 1920 Summer Olympics
American male boxers